Alf Kåre Tveit (born 26 April  1967) is a former footballer who played from 1988 to 1993 for Viking FK, where he won both the league and cup championship. He was selected for the national squad in a match against Scotland, but never got his first cap.

Tveit got the nickname fygaren for his celebrations after scoring, where he stretched his arms out ran in a zig-zag movement. He is also remembered for a controversial situation in a match against Vard in 1988. In overtime, he headed the ball out of the hands of the goalkeeper, rounded him and was tackled. The following penalty kick, made by Arild Ravndal, sent Viking to the 1st Division at the expense of Start, who had to go to play-offs.

References

External links 
 

Living people
1967 births
Norwegian footballers
Viking FK players
Eliteserien players
Association football forwards
People from Lyngdal
Sportspeople from Agder